Limnaecia compsasis is a moth in the family Cosmopterigidae. It is found in China.

References

Natural History Museum Lepidoptera generic names catalog

Limnaecia
Moths described in 1935
Moths of Asia
Taxa named by Edward Meyrick